Holger Geschwindner (born September 12, 1945 in Bad Nauheim, Hessen) is a German former professional basketball player. He is known as the long-time coach and mentor of ex-Dallas Mavericks player Dirk Nowitzki. Geschwindner first met Nowitzki when the future basketball superstar was 16 years old.

Geschwindner acted as an official coach of the Dallas Mavericks and runs a basketball academy in Würzburg, Germany that he calls "The Institute of Applied Nonsense". In 1995, Geschwindner calculated the optimum angle of a jump shot to be 60 degrees.

Early life 
A native of Würzburg, Geschwindner is alleged to have learned basketball as a young boy from an American soldier stationed in Germany.

References 
 http://www.nba.com/germany/sharpshooters/holger_040831.html
 http://www.derra-bie.de/holger.htm
 Time (magazine)

1945 births
Living people
People from Bad Nauheim
Sportspeople from Darmstadt (region)
Basketball players at the 1972 Summer Olympics
BSC Saturn Köln players
German men's basketball players
Olympic basketball players of West Germany